Pyeongchon New Town refers to a planned city surrounding Dongan-gu of Anyang.

New towns in South Korea
Dongan-gu
New towns started in the 1980s